Tina Schiechtl (born 15 January 1984) is an Austrian former professional tennis player.

On 25 September 2006, she reached her highest WTA singles ranking of 230. On 9 December 2013, she peaked at No. 1033 in the doubles rankings.
In her career, Schiechtl won nine singles titles on the ITF Circuit.

Her last match on the pro circuit took place in April 2014.

ITF Circuit finals

Singles: 18 (9 titles, 9 runner-ups)

Doubles: 1 (runner-up)

References

External links
 
 

1984 births
Living people
People from Kitzbühel
Austrian female tennis players
Sportspeople from Tyrol (state)